Borrowdale is a civil parish in the Borough of Allerdale in Cumbria, England.  It contains 39 listed buildings that are recorded in the National Heritage List for England.  All the listed buildings are designated at Grade II, the lowest of the three grades, which is applied to "buildings of national importance and special interest".  The parish is in the Lake District National Park, and it includes the settlements of Rosthwaite, Stonethwaite, Seathwaite, Seatoller, Grange, and Watendlath.  Parts of the parish are agricultural, and much of it consists of fells and mountains. All the listed buildings are in the settlements and the valleys.  A high proportion of them are, or originated as, houses, cottages, farmhouses or farm buildings.  The other listed buildings are seven bridges, a former corn mill, a war memorial, and two telephone kiosks.


Buildings

References

Citations

Sources

Lists of listed buildings in Cumbria